The following is a list of professional bodies in the United Kingdom.  Membership of a professional body does not necessarily mean that a person possesses qualifications in the subject area, nor that they are legally able to practice their profession.  Many of these bodies also act as learned societies for the academic disciplines underlying their professions. The UK government has a list of professional associations approved for tax purposes (this includes some non-UK based associations, which are not included here). There is a separate list of regulators in the United Kingdom for bodies that are regulators rather than professional associations.

Chartered 

The following professional bodies are incorporated by royal charter:

A–B 

 
 Association of Chartered Certified Accountants (ACCA)
 Association of Corporate Treasurers (ACT)
 Association for Project Management (APM)
 Association for Science Education (ASE)
 British Computer Society (BCS)
 British Psychological Society (BPS)
 British Society of Gastroenterology (BSG)

C–D 

 Chartered Institute of Management Accountants (CIMA)
 Chartered Association of Building Engineers (CABE)
 Chartered Institute for Archaeologists (CIFA)
 Chartered Institute for Securities and Investment (CISI)
 Chartered Institute of Arbitrators (CIArb)
 Chartered Institute of Architectural Technologists (CIAT)
 Chartered Banker Institute
 Chartered Institute of Building (CIOB)
 Chartered Institute of Credit Management (CICM)
 Chartered Institute of Ecology and Environmental Management (CIEEM)
 Chartered Institute of Environmental Health (CIEH)
 Chartered Institute of Fundraising (CIof)
 Chartered Institute of Housing (CIH)
 Chartered Institute of Internal Auditors (IIA)
 Chartered Institute of Journalists
 Chartered Institute of Legal Executives (CILEX)
 Chartered Institute of Library and Information Professionals (CILIP)
 Chartered Institute of Linguists (CIOL)
 Chartered Institute of Logistics and Transport (CILT)
 Chartered Institute of Loss Adjusters (CILA)
 Chartered Institute of Marketing (CIM)
 Chartered Institute for the Management of Sport and Physical Activity (CIMSPA)
 Chartered Institute of Patent Attorneys (CIPA)
 Chartered Institute of Payroll Professionals (CIPP)
 Chartered Institute of Personnel and Development  (CIPD)
 Chartered Institute of Plumbing and Heating Engineering  (CIPHE)
 Chartered Institute of Procurement & Supply (CIPS)
 Chartered Institute of Public Finance and Accountancy (CIPFA)
 Chartered Institute of Public Relations (CIPR)
Chartered Institution of Railway Operators (CIRO)
 Chartered Institute of Taxation (CIOT)
Chartered Institution of Building Services Engineers (CIBSE)
 Chartered Institution of Civil Engineering Surveyors (CICES)
 Chartered Institution of Highways and Transportation (CIHT)
 Chartered Institution of Wastes Management (CIWM)
 Chartered Institution of Water and Environmental Management (CIWEM)
 Chartered Insurance Institute (CII)
 Chartered Management Institute (CMI)
 Chartered Quality Institute (CQI)
 Chartered Society of Designers (CSD)
 Chartered Society of Physiotherapy (CSP)
 Chartered Trading Standards Institute (CTSI)
 College of Optometrists (CoO)
 College of Paramedics (CoP)
 The Chartered College of Teaching (CCT)

E–H 

 Energy Institute (EI)
 English Association (EA)
 Geological Society of London

I–J 

 Institute and Faculty of Actuaries (IFoA)
 Institute of Chartered Accountants in England & Wales (ICAEW)
 Institute of Chartered Accountants in Ireland (ICAI, operates in Northern Ireland)
 Institute of Chartered Accountants of Scotland (ICAS)
 Institute of Chartered Foresters (ICF)
 Institute of Chartered Secretaries and Administrators (ICSA)
 Institute of Chartered Shipbrokers (ICS) 
 Institute of Conservation (Icon)
 Institute of Directors (IoD)
 Institution of Gas Engineers & Managers (IGEM)
 Institute of Health and Social Care Management (IHSCM)
 Institute of Marine Engineering, Science and Technology (IMarEST)
 Institute of Materials, Minerals and Mining (IOM3)
 Institute of Mathematics and its Applications (IMA)
 Institute of Measurement and Control (InstMC)
 Institute of Physics (IoP)
 Institute of Practitioners in Advertising (IPA)
 Institute of Refrigeration (InstR)
 Institution of Chemical Engineers (IChemE)
 Institution of Civil Engineers (ICE)
 Institution of Engineering and Technology (IET)
 Institution of Engineering Designers  (IED)
 Institution of Mechanical Engineers  (IMechE)
 Institution of Occupational Safety and Health (IOSH)
 Institution of Royal Engineers (InstRE)
 Institution of Structural Engineers (IStructE)

K–P 

 Landscape Institute (LI)
 The Law Society (LS)
 Law Society of Northern Ireland
 Linnean Society of London (LS)

Q–Z 

 Royal Aeronautical Society (RAeS)
 Royal Agricultural Society of England (RASE)
 Royal Anthropological Institute (RAI)
 Royal Asiatic Society (RAS)
 Royal Astronomical Society (RAS)
 Royal College of Anaesthetists
 Royal College of General Practitioners (RCGP)
 Royal College of Nursing (RCN)
 Royal College of Obstetricians and Gynaecologists (RCOG)
 Royal College of Organists (RCO)
 Royal College of Paediatrics and Child Health (RCPCH)
 Royal College of Physicians and Surgeons of Glasgow
 Royal College of Physicians of Edinburgh
 Royal College of Physicians of London
 Royal College of Psychiatrists
 Royal College of Radiologists (RCR)
 Royal College of Speech and Language Therapists (RCSLT)
 Royal College of Surgeons of England
 Royal College of Surgeons of Edinburgh
 Royal College of Veterinary Surgeons (RCVS)
 Royal Economic Society (RES)
 Royal Geographical Society (RGS-IBG)
 Royal Historical Society (RHS)
 Royal Incorporation of Architects in Scotland (RIAS)
 Royal Institute of British Architects (RIBA)
 Royal Institute of Navigation (RIN)
 Royal Institution of Chartered Surveyors (RICS)
 Royal Institution of Naval Architects (RINA)
 Royal Meteorological Society (RMetS)
 Royal Microscopical Society (RMS)
 Royal Pharmaceutical Society (RPS)
 Royal Photographic Society (RPS)
 Royal Society for Public Health (RSPH)
 Royal Society of Biology (RSB)
 Royal Society of Chemistry (RSC)
 Royal Society of Medicine (RSM)
 Royal Statistical Society (RSS)
 Royal Town Planning Institute (RTPI)
 Society for Radiological Protection (SRP)
 Society of Dyers and Colourists (SDC)
 The Textile Institute (TEXI)

Non-chartered

A 

 
 The Academy of Experts (TAE) 
 Arboricultural Association (AA) 
 Archives and Records Association (ARA)
 Association for the Education and Guardianship of International Students (AEGIS)
 Association of Accounting Technicians (AAT)
 Association of Chief Executives of Voluntary Organisations (ACEVO)
 Association of Taxation Technicians (ATT)
 Association of University Administrators (AUA)

B–G 

 British and International Golf Greenkeepers Association (BIGGA)
 British Association for Counselling and Psychotherapy (BACP)
 British Association of Social Workers (BASW)
 British Guild of Travel Writers (BGTW)
 British Occupational Hygiene Society (BOHS)
 Institute of Osteopathy (BOA)
 British Pest Control Association (BPCA)
 College of Paramedics (CoP)
 Direct Marketing Association (DMA)
 Faculty of Advocates
 Freshwater Biological Association (FBA)
 General Council of the Bar (Bar Council)

H–I 

 Immigration Law Practitioners Association (ILPA)
 Incorporated Society of Musicians (ISM)
 Information and Records Management Society (IRMS)
 The Inns of Court, comprising Gray's Inn, Lincoln's Inn, Inner Temple, and Middle Temple
 Insolvency Practitioners Association (IPA)
 Institute for the Management of Information Systems (IMIS)
 Institute of Acoustics
 Institute of Administrative Management (IAM)
 Institute of Biomedical Science (IBMS)
 Institute of Certified Bookkeepers (ICB)
 Institute of Commercial Management (ICM)
 Institute of Corporate Responsibility and Sustainability (ICRS)
 Institute of Economic Development (IED)
 Institute of Environmental Management and Assessment (IEMA)
 Institute of Employability Professionals (IEP)
 Institute of Financial Accountants (IFA)
 Institute of Food Science and Technology (IFST)
 Institute of Groundsmanship (IOG)
 Institute of Information Security Professionals (IISP)
 Institute of Interim Management (IIM)
 Institute of Leadership & Management (InstLM)
 Institute of Professional Sound (IPS)
 Institute of Science and Technology (IST)
 Institute of Scientific and Technical Communicators (ISTC)
 Institute of Tourist Guiding (ITG)
 Institute of Trade Mark Attorneys (ITMA)
 Institute of Transport Administration (IoTA)
 Institute of Workplace and Facilities Management (IWFM)
 Institution of Agricultural Engineers (IAgrE)
 Institution of Analysts and Programmers (IAP)
 Institution of Environmental Sciences (IES)
 Institution of Fire Engineers (IFE)
 Institution of Railway Signal Engineers (IRSE)
 International Association of Hydrogeologists (IAH)
 International Institute of Risk and Safety Management (IIRSM)
 International Society of Typographic Designers (ISTD)
 Institute of Financial Accountants (IFA)

J–Z 

 Museums Association (MA)
 Operational Research Society (ORS)
 Palaeontological Association (PalAss)
 Professional Publishers Association (PPA)
 Royal Society of Ulster Architects (RSUA)
 Security Institute (SyI)
 Society of British and International Interior Design (SBID)
 Society of Indexers (SI)
 Society and College of Radiographers (SCoR)
 Society of Trust and Estate Practitioners (STEP)
 United Kingdom Council for Psychotherapy (UKCP)

See also 

 List of organisations in the United Kingdom with a royal charter
 List of regulators in the United Kingdom
 Livery company

References 

Professional associations in the United Kingdom, List of

United Kingdom